Nyord is a Danish island in the Baltic Sea, southeast of Zealand, just north of Møn island.

Nyord covers an area of approximately 5 km², although only 1.2 km² is cultivatable moraine, while the remaining 4 km² is salt-meadow which is used for summer grazing, but is flooded during the winter.

The island is reached by a narrow bridge from the larger island of Møn. The bridge was constructed in 1968 and replaced the post boat Røret which had been in service since 1902. The boat was not large enough for animals such as cattle or horses, which had to swim alongside the boat.

History

Traditionally the island has been self-sufficient, relying upon farming, fishing and piloting. Prior to 1769 the island belonged to the crown, but at this time crown lands were sold off, and the islanders purchased their own island for 3903 rigsdaler. The waters around the island are sufficiently treacherous that islanders could gain a livelihood as pilots, and this became enshrined in law as both a right and duty of the islanders between 1721 and 1879. After 1879 pilots were employed directly by the government instead of earning individual fees. A number of pilots houses and a lookout were constructed  when the government took over the service. Piloting ceased in 1966.

The village of Nyord remains similar to its original design, with traditional thatched cottages and farm houses. It has a church, museum and small harbour. There is a restaurant Lolles Gård which is both a farm and a restaurant, there also is a village shop. The marshland area crossed by the bridge from the main island has one of Denmark's most important habitats for geese, ducks and other wading birds. There is an observation tower for birdwatchers to use.

See also
 List of islands of Denmark.
 Ulvshale, adjacent to Nyord on the island of Møn.

Notes

References
 Tageo.com, "VESTSJAELLAND DENMARK Geography Population" (coordinates), 2007, webpage: Tageo-index.
 Tele.dk Denmark detailed road map, webpage: Tele-DK-Danmark.

External links

 Island website

Geography of Vordingborg Municipality
Islands of Denmark
Møn
Birdwatching sites in Denmark
Ramsar sites in Denmark